St. Hyacinth or Saint Hyacinthe may refer to:

People
 Hyacinth of Caesarea (died 108), early Christian martyr
 Hyacinth and Protus (martyred 257-9), Christian saints
 Hyacinth of Poland ( - 1257), Dominican friar and saint
 Hyacintha Mariscotti (1585–1640), Italian Franciscan nun and saint
 Giacinto Giordano Ansaloni (1598-1634), Italian Dominican martyred in Japan

Places in Canada 
Saint-Hyacinthe, Quebec, a city
St. Hyacinthe (electoral district), a former federal electoral district in Quebec
Saint-Hyacinthe—Bagot, a federal electoral district in Quebec
Saint-Hyacinthe (provincial electoral district), a provincial electoral riding in the Montérégie region of Quebec

Sports 
 Saint-Hyacinthe Laser, a former junior ice hockey team in the Quebec Major Junior Hockey League, Canada
 Saint-Hyacinthe Chiefs, a former minor hockey team in the Ligue Nord-Américaine de Hockey, Canada

Other uses 
 Saint-Hyacinthe railway station, a Via Rail station in Saint-Hyacinthe, Quebec, Canada
 Saint-Hyacinthe Aerodrome, located just west of Saint-Hyacinthe, Quebec, Canada
 Cégep de Saint-Hyacinthe, a college of general and vocational education

See also
 Hyacinth (disambiguation)
 San Jacinto (disambiguation), "Saint Hyacinth" in Spanish
 St. Hyacinth's Church (disambiguation)